Sir James Sidney Rawdon Scott-Hopkins (29 November 1921 – 11 March 1995) was a British Conservative politician.

Born in Croydon, Scott-Hopkins was educated at Eton College and the University of Oxford. He joined the British Army in 1939. He was commissioned in the 3rd QAO Gurkha Rifles in 1942 and served on the North-West Frontier, commanding C Company of the 4th Battalion, and in Burma until 1946, having taken a regular commission in the King's Own Yorkshire Light Infantry in 1944. He retired from the Army in 1950 and became a farmer. He married Geraldine Hargreaves in Eton in 1946 (three sons, one daughter).

Scott-Hopkins contested Bedwellty in 1955. He was Member of Parliament (MP) for North Cornwall from 1959 until he lost the seat to the Liberal John Pardoe in 1966. He had served as joint Parliamentary Secretary at MAFF 1962–64. He was re-elected as MP for West Derbyshire at a 1967 by-election, and served until 1979.

His successor was Matthew Parris. He had served, concurrently (to 1979), as a Member of the European Parliament (MEP) from 1979, when he was elected for the Hereford and Worcester European constituency, serving until 1994. He was knighted in 1981. He died in Westminster, aged 73.

References
 Times Guide to the House of Commons October 1974

External links

 

1921 births
1995 deaths
Royal Gurkha Rifles officers
King's Own Yorkshire Light Infantry officers
Indian Army personnel of World War II
British Army personnel of World War II
Conservative Party (UK) MPs for English constituencies
Members of the Parliament of the United Kingdom for constituencies in Derbyshire
UK MPs 1959–1964
UK MPs 1964–1966
UK MPs 1966–1970
UK MPs 1970–1974
UK MPs 1974
UK MPs 1974–1979
People educated at Eton College
Members of the Parliament of the United Kingdom for North Cornwall
Conservative Party (UK) MEPs
MEPs for the United Kingdom 1973–1979
MEPs for England 1979–1984
MEPs for England 1984–1989
MEPs for England 1989–1994
Alumni of the University of Oxford
Knights Bachelor
Politicians awarded knighthoods
Ministers in the Macmillan and Douglas-Home governments, 1957–1964